Adony may refer to:

Adony (also Duna·adony, Duna-Adony), a town in Fejér County, Hungary
Éradony, a town in Bihor County, now Romania
Nyíradony, a city in Hajdú-Bihar County, Hungary

See also
Adoni (disambiguation)
Adonis (disambiguation)
Adonai